Mazur Elk is a Polish football club playing currently in III Liga (4th level of Polish league system) . The club was founded in 1946.

Historical Names 
 1946 Wojskowy Klub Sportowy (WKS) Mazur Ełk (resolved w 1953)
 1946 Kolejowy Klub Sportowy (KKS) Ełk (1949 Związkowy Klub Sportowy (ZKS) Kolejarz Ełk)
 1955 Kolejowy Klub Sportowy (KKS) Mazur Ełk
 1990 Miejski Klub Sportowy (MKS) Mazur Ełk

Current squad

Notable players 

 Andrzej Zgutczyński
 Paweł Sobolewski

 
Association football clubs established in 1946
1946 establishments in Poland
Ełk County